Greenhills is a village in Hamilton County, Ohio, United States. The population was 3,741 at the 2020 census. A planned community, it was established by the United States government during the Great Depression. Most of the village is a National Historic Landmark for its history as a planned modernist community.

History and significance

As one of three Greenbelt Communities built by the Resettlement Administration during the 1930s (the other two are Greenbelt, Maryland and Greendale, Wisconsin), Greenhills was designed to be surrounded by a "belt" of woodland and natural landscaping. Like the other six "FDR towns", Greenhills was founded as a sundown town, using restrictive covenants to prevent minorities from purchasing homes there. Many families include third- and fourth-generation descendants of the village's original "pioneers" who occupied the original International-style townhomes. The original government-built area, the Greenhills Historic District, is listed on the National Register of Historic Places and is a National Historic Landmark. The community's James Whallon House, which serves as the village hall is also listed in the National Register of Historic Places.  The landmarked area encompasses about three quarters of the area within the village bounds, excepting only the northeastern section northeast of Farragut and Ingram Roads.

Geography
Greenhills is located at  (39.268608, -84.517284).

Demographics

As of the 2010 census of 2010, there were 3,615 people, 1,499 households, and 968 families residing in the village. The racial makeup of the village was 88.0% White, 6.7% African American, 0.1% Native American, 0.8% Asian, 0.1% Pacific Islander, 0.7% from other races, and 3.6% from two or more races. Hispanic or Latino of any race were 2.4% of the population.

There were 1,499 households, of which 30.5% had children under the age of 18 living with them, 46.0% were married couples living together, 14.0% had a female householder with no husband present, 4.6% had a male householder with no wife present, and 35.4% were non-families. 30.3% of all households were made up of individuals, and 9.9% had someone living alone who was 65 years of age or older. The average household size was 2.37 and the average family size was 2.95.

The median age in the village was 39 years. 23.8% of residents were under the age of 18; 7.1% were between the ages of 18 and 24; 26.2% were from 25 to 44; 27% were from 45 to 64; and 16% were 65 years of age or older. The gender makeup of the village was 47.2% male and 52.8% female.

Education
Greenhills is served by the Winton Woods City School District and a branch of the Public Library of Cincinnati and Hamilton County.

See also
List of National Historic Landmarks in Ohio

References

External links
 Village website
 Waycross Community Media
 Winton Woods City School District

Villages in Hamilton County, Ohio
Villages in Ohio
1930s establishments in Ohio
Planned communities in the United States
National Register of Historic Places in Hamilton County, Ohio
Historic districts on the National Register of Historic Places in Ohio
Historic districts in Hamilton County, Ohio
National Historic Landmarks in Ohio
Sundown towns in Ohio
New Deal in Ohio